Archaeothyris is an extinct genus of ophiacodontid synapsid that lived during the Late Carboniferous and is known from Nova Scotia. Dated to 306 million years ago, Archaeothyris, along with a more poorly known synapsid called Echinerpeton, are the oldest undisputed synapsids known. The name means ancient window (Greek), and refers to the opening in the skull, the temporal fenestra, which indicates this is an early synapsid. Protoclepsydrops also from Nova Scotia is slightly older but is known by very fragmentary materials.

Description
 
Archaeothyris was more advanced than the early sauropsids, having strong jaws that could open wider than those of the early reptiles. While its sharp teeth were all of the same size & shape, it did possess a pair of enlarged canines, suggesting that it was a carnivore.

Archaeothyris' legs were articulated laterally at its pelvis and shoulders, which gave it a sprawling stance. The first toe is smaller than the second.

Classification
Archaeothyris belonged to the family Ophiacodontidae, a group of early pelycosaurs that evolved early in the Late Carboniferous. It was one of the earliest and most basal synapsids (the group which includes mammals).

Below is a cladogram modified from the analysis of Benson (2012):

Discovery and paleoecology
Fossils of Archaeothyris were first described in 1972 from the Joggins fossil cliffs, the same locality in which the early reptiles Hylonomus and Petrolacosaurus (both of which resemble Archaeothyris) were found.

Archaeothyris lived in what is now Nova Scotia, about 306 million years ago in the Carboniferous Period (Pennsylvanian). 
Nova Scotia at this time was a swamp, similar to today's Everglades in Florida. Archaeothyris and the other early amniotes lived in the moist vegetation on the forest ground, together with the more terrestrially adapted labyrinthodont amphibians.

See also

 List of pelycosaurs
 Evolution of mammals
 List of transitional fossils
 Carboniferous tetrapods

References

Further reading

External links
 Transitional Vertebrate Fossils - includes description of important transitional genera from reptile to mammal (includes a little information about Archaeothyris)

Ophiacodontids
Prehistoric synapsid genera
Carboniferous synapsids
Carboniferous synapsids of North America
Transitional fossils
Taxa named by Robert R. Reisz
Fossil taxa described in 1972
Paleozoic life of Nova Scotia